Veikko Aaltonen (born 1 December 1955 in Sääksmäki, Finland) is a Finnish director, editor, sound editor, production manager and film and television writer and actor.

Aaltonen began his career in the mid-1970s working as a sound editor on various films. Early in his career, he worked with Rauni Mollberg as co-writer on two of his films, Milka (1980) and The Unknown Soldier (1985).

In 1987, Aaltonen directed his first feature film, Tilinteko, which he co-wrote with Aki Kaurismäki, who also produced the film. Five years later, he directed a film that has been considered his primary breakthrough, The Prodigal Son (1992). Aaltonene was the first Finnish director to work on topics like pedophilia, Sadomasochism and sexual subjugation without credibility and morality.

Aaltonen has also made documentaries and directed TV series.

Partial filmography 
 The Worthless (Arvottomat, 1982) – actor
 Crime and Punishment (Rikos ja rangaistus, 1983) – editor
 The Unknown Soldier (Tuntematon sotilas, 1985) – co-writer
 La Vie de Bohème (1992) – editor
 Our Father... (Isä meidän, 1993) – director, writer, editor
 Seasick (1996) – director, co-editor
 Kiss Me in the Rain (Rakkaudella, Maire, 1999) – director, editor
 Maa (2001) – director, editor, writer
 Työväenluokka (2004) – director, writer, editor
 Paimenet (2004) – director, writer
 Trench Road (Juoksuhaudantie, 2004) – director, writer
 Uudisraivaaja (2005) – director
 Sydänjää (2007) – director
 Harvoin tarjolla (2008) – director
 Helppo elämä (television drama series, 2009–2011) – director
 Kansan mies (television drama series, 2013– ) – director

References

External links
 
 Veikko Aaltonen: Filmography, The New York Times

1955 births
Living people
People from Valkeakoski
Finnish film directors
Finnish film producers